Jill Alper (born September 12, 1965) is an American political consultant. She founded Alper Strategies & Media, a media firm, in 2016. She also served as the head of Dewey Square Groups' campaign and integrated media practice.

Career
Alper has served as an electoral strategist for the presidential campaigns of Bill Clinton as the Democratic National Committee (DNC) Political Director and Al Gore, where she coordinated state-specific media efforts, ran election day, and started the re-count effort. She was the electoral strategist for John Kerry, for whom she put together nomination and general election state plans.

In the 1992 cycle, she was Deputy Political Director and ran candidate recruitment and incumbent protection efforts for the Democratic Senatorial Campaign Committee (DSCC) overall.

Alper started in politics at 15 when she met Massachusetts Governor Mike Dukakis of as a result of her lawsuit against Senate President William M. Bulger, who refused to hire women to serve as senate pages. The suit was eventually dropped when Bulger hired a woman after sustained media attention.

She later served as the Deputy Iowa Field Director for Dukakis' presidential campaign.

She served as strategist to Detroit Mayor Dave Bing and Governor Jennifer Granholm of Michigan in both of her races and is a member of the Democratic National Committee.

Alper co-founded the Women's Information Network in 1989. In 1993, she received the Women of Distinction Award from the American Association of University Women. In 2010, she was named to the Aristotle Campaign Dream Team. Politico highlights Jill Alper as a "Featured Caucus Member" in their American politics blog, the Politico Caucus.

2016 Election
In the 2016 Democratic Party presidential primaries, Alper served as one of Michigan's 17 superdelegates, pledging support to Democratic Presidential Candidate Hillary Clinton.

Personal life
She married David Katz, former Deputy Wayne County Executive for Edward H. McNamara, who managed the campaign of then Attorney General Jennifer Granholm for governor in 2002, in 2004. They reside in Grosse Pointe, Michigan, with their son and stepson.

References

External links
 ABC 2004: The Invisible Primary

American political consultants
American campaign managers
Michigan Democrats
People from Hartselle, Alabama
Living people
American women in politics
1965 births
Boston College alumni
People from Grosse Pointe, Michigan
21st-century American women politicians
21st-century American politicians